The Blue Line or Line 1 is one of the two lines of Chennai Metro, Phase 1 Project, the second being the Green line. The line consists of 26 stations out of which 13 stations are underground and 13 stations are elevated.

Map

Stations

Blue Line (Main route)

The line connects the northeast and the southwest ends of the city. The stations include:

Inter-Corridor Line

See also
 Chennai Metro
 Chennai Monorail
 Chennai Mass Rapid Transit System
 Chennai Suburban Railway
 Transport in Chennai
 List of rapid transit systems in India
 List of metro systems

References

Chennai Metro lines
Railway lines opened in 2016